Trial by Error: The Aarushi Files is an investigative audio drama podcast series that covers the Noida double murder case.

Content 
The podcast is an eight-part series co-written and hosted by journalist Nishita Jha. Adapted from Avirook Sen's book Aarushi, the podcast narrates the unfolding of the Noida double murder case and its subsequent investigation in the format of interviews and thematic discussions. The first episode aired on 1 May 2016 and has since aired weekly. The series is produced by New Delhi-based film-making collective Jamun and is aired by digital content company, Arré, and music streaming service Saavn.

Episodes

See also 

 Podcasting in India

References

External links 

 

Crime in Noida
Crime podcasts
2016 podcast debuts
2016 podcast endings
Audio podcasts